Schafstedt is a municipality in the district of Dithmarschen, in Schleswig-Holstein, Germany.

See also
Albersdorf (Amt Kirchspielslandgemeinde)

References

Dithmarschen